Gralee is a suburb of Leeton, New South Wales in Leeton Shire.  Gralee facilities include: 
 St Francis De Sales Regional College 
 Gralee Special School 
 Ricegrowers Co-operative Limited Headquarters
 Leeton Caravan Park
 Leeton Soldiers Club
 Riverina Motel
 Heritage Motor Inn
 Leeton Visitors Information Centre
 Leeton Coach Terminal
 Lutheran Church
 Scout Hall
 Grahame Park
 Leeton Golf Course
 Leeton Veterinary Hospital
 Gralee Store

Gralee (Gra + Lee) was named after Leeton poet, "Jim Grahame" (J. W. Gordon), as was Grahame Park.

The Geographical Names Board of New South Wales no longer recognises Gralee as a suburb.

References

Suburbs of Leeton, New South Wales